Red House School is a co-educational independent school in Norton, Stockton-on-Tees, in the north-east of England.

Nursery, Reception and Year 1 are located in a purpose-built unit, whilst Years 2, 3 and 4 are in a Georgian Vicarage. The Preparatory School and Senior School are in a manor house.

In 2010 Red House came 1st in the independent secondary school with no sixth form category in The Sunday Times Parent League Tables 2010. 
A school's place in the Sunday Times league tables is determined by the percentage of its students who achieve A - C grades at GCSE, and A and B grades at A level.

In 2019, the school achieved a 99% A*-C grade across all GCSE results.

Notable former pupils

 Simon Clarke – politician
James Simpson-Daniel – Rugby Union player
 Paul Johnston – Cricketer
 Jack Gibbons – pianist & composer
 Russell Earnshaw
 David Tibet – poet, artist and musician

Arms

References

External links
 

Educational institutions established in 1929
Private schools in the Borough of Stockton-on-Tees
1929 establishments in England